Compsemys  is an extinct genus of prehistoric turtles from the Late Cretaceous and Paleocene of North America and possibly Europe. The type species C. victa, first described by Joseph Leidy from the Hell Creek Formation in Montana in 1856, and another probable species C. russelli (originally placed in the separate genus Berruchelus), described in 2012, from Paleocene deposits in France. Its affinites have long been uncertain, but it has recently been considered to be the most basal member of Paracryptodira, despite the clade first appearing in the Late Jurassic, and is sometimes included in its own family, Compsemydidae. A revision in 2020 found Compsemydidae to be more expansive, also containing Riodevemys and Selenemys from the Late Jurassic of Europe, and Peltochelys from the Early Cretaceous of Europe.

This allows even small shell fragments to be identified as Compsemys. The skull resembles that of the alligator turtle, with a sharply hooked beak; Compsemys must have been an aquatic carnivore. The oldest known shell fragments identifiable as Compsemys are known from the Santonian stage of the Late Cretaceous in North America, while European remains are not known until the Paleocene. Compsemys is suggested to have dispersed into Europe during the early Paleocene via Greenland. The morphology of the skull suggests that Compsemys was a hypercarnivorous snapping turtle.

References

Paracryptodira
Late Cretaceous turtles of North America
Paleocene turtles
Cenozoic turtles of North America
Prehistoric turtle genera
Hell Creek fauna
Laramie Formation
Ojo Alamo Formation
Kaiparowits Formation
Fossil taxa described in 1856
Taxa named by Joseph Leidy